Orthaga thyrisalis is a species of moth of the family Pyralidae. It is found in Australia.

References

Moths of Australia
Epipaschiinae
Endemic fauna of Australia
Moths described in 1858